Takahata (written:  or ) is a Japanese surname. Notable people with the surname include:

, Japanese actress and voice actress
, Japanese film director, animator, screenwriter and producer
, Japanese tennis player
, Japanese actress
, Japanese actress and singer
, Japanese footballer
, Japanese footballer and manager

Japanese-language surnames